The Swedish Theory of Love is a 2015 Swedish documentary film directed by Erik Gandini.

The documentary offers a critical look into the ideas and practice of "state individualism". Most benefits of the welfare state are in Sweden connected with the individual and seeks to promote their individual autonomy, whereas in other countries the institutions of the welfare state are more focused on households. In Swedish this ideology is called statist individualism. The film examines at how this has affected Swedish society since the 1960s.

The movie has been reviewed as "with great rhythm and without losing the audience along the way, Gandini shows us the other, darker side of progress, riches and independence." Another reviewer said that "It doesn’t really add up to much of an argument, jollied along as it is by stylised editing and jaunty ironic music."

Notes

External links

2015 films
Swedish documentary films
Films directed by Erik Gandini
2015 documentary films
2010s Swedish films